Inoscavin A is an antioxidant isolated from the mushroom Inonotus xeranticus.

See also 
 Inoscavin

References

External links 
 

Hispidins
Inonotus
Lactones
Spiro compounds